Dheewari (Fisherman's Daughter) is a 2011 Sri Lankan Sinhala drama film directed by Salinda Perera and produced by Chandran Rutnam. It stars Sangeetha Weeraratne, Joe Abeywickrama in lead roles along with Cyril Wickramage and Jackson Anthony. Music composed by Pradeep Ratnayake. The film was based on the novel Dheewari of Raja Procter. It was adapted for the screen by Salinda Perera and Darrell Costa. Singhalese translations were made during filming.  It is the 1163rd Sri Lankan film in the Sinhala cinema. The film has achieved mostly positive reviews from both local and international festivals.

Plot

Cast
 Sangeetha Weeraratne as Valli
 Joe Abeywickrama as Mudalali
 Cyril Wickramage as Peduru
 Jackson Anthony as Manuel
 Trilicia Gunawardena as Josie
 Veena Jayakody as Mudalali's wife
 Roger Seneviratne
 Grace Ariyawimal
 Ramani Siriwardena
 Premilla Kuruppu
 Gnananga Gunawardena

References

2011 films
2010s Sinhala-language films
Films based on Sri Lankan novels